Perfidia is a historical romance and crime fiction novel by American author James Ellroy. Published in 2014, it is the first novel in the second L.A. Quartet, referring to his four prior novels from the first L.A. Quartet. Perfidia was released September 9, 2014. A Waterstones exclusive limited edition of Perfidia was released September 11, 2014, and includes an essay by Ellroy himself titled "Ellroy's History – Then and Now." The title, Perfidia, is Italian for the word perfidy, (see also perfidia) and is also the name of the big band song, Perfidia.

Plot
 
The main characters are Hideo Ashida, a Japanese Los Angeles Police Department (LAPD) chemist, Kay Lake, a young woman looking for adventure, the real life William H. Parker, a gifted LAPD captain with a drinking problem, and Dudley Smith, an LAPD sergeant born in Dublin, Ireland, and raised in Los Angeles. The novel is told in real time, covering 23 days with the dates and the time the chapters and events are occurring, as well as through Kay Lake's diary. An entry from Kay Lake's diary begins Perfidia, followed by a bootleg transmitter radio broadcast on Friday, December 5, 1941, being broadcast by real-life Gerald L. K. Smith. The first chapter introduces the reader to Hideo Ashida, on Saturday, December 6, 1941, at 9:08 am. Since many fictional and real-life characters appear in Perfidia, many from his prior novels, Ellroy added a dramatis personæ, which notes the previous appearances of characters in Perfidia, as well as short summaries for some of the characters.

Reviews and reception
Perfidia was on The New York Times Best Sellers list for hardcover fiction at number 16 on September 28, 2014. It also was an Editors' Choice at The New York Times on September 12, 2014. NPR added Perfidia as one of the best books of 2014 out of approximately 250 titles. Perfidia was also one of the eighty books nominated for the 2015 Folio Prize by the Folio Prize Academy.

References

External links

 https://www.jamesellroy.net/books/perfidia/ Retrieved 2017-06-10
 https://www.nytimes.com/2014/09/07/books/review/james-ellroys-perfidia.html Retrieved 2015-06-27
 https://apps.npr.org/best-books-2014/#/book/perfidia-a-novel Retrieved 2017-06-10
 https://vimeo.com/107267635 Retrieved 2018-01-17

2014 American novels
Novels by James Ellroy
Historical crime novels
Books with cover art by Chip Kidd
Fiction set in 1941
Alfred A. Knopf books
Heinemann (publisher) books